Kalsom binti Noordin is a Malaysian politician who has served as Member of the Malacca State Executive Council (EXCO) in the Barisan Nasional (BN) state administration under Chief Minister Sulaiman Md Ali since November 2021 and Member of the Malacca State Legislative Assembly (MLA) for Pengkalan Batu since November 2021. She is the sole female EXCO member and a member of the United Malays National Organisation (UMNO), a component party of the ruling BN coalition.

Election results

References

External links 
 

1953 births
Living people
People from Malacca
Malaysian people of Malay descent
Malaysian Muslims
United Malays National Organisation politicians
21st-century Malaysian politicians
Members of the Malacca State Legislative Assembly
Malacca state executive councillors
Women MLAs in Malacca
21st-century Malaysian women politicians